Gymnopilus ochraceus is a species of mushroom in the family Hymenogastraceae.

See also

List of Gymnopilus species

External links
Gymnopilus ochraceus at Index Fungorum

ochraceus
Fungi of North America